Agnes Torres is a transgender woman who participated in Harold Garfinkel's research in the early 1960s, making her the first subject of an in-depth discussion of transgender identity in sociology. She is the subject of a 2018 documentary short.

Early life
Torres was born in 1939 and assigned male at birth. She was the youngest of four children. Her mother worked in an aircraft plant; her machinist father died when she was eight. Torres was raised Catholic, but stopped believing in God when she was older. From the age of twelve, Torres took her mother's post-hysterectomy estrogen pills and feminized her body. At seventeen, she began dressing and acting in a feminine manner.

In 1958 she was working as a typist for an insurance company, and had a boyfriend. She resisted his desire for intercourse and marriage, leading to a series of quarrels before she disclosed her details to him. Their relationship continued.

Appearance
When Garfinkel first met Torres, she possessed physiology typically associated with the social categories of "male" and "female" at the same time. She had a penis and testicles as well as secondary female characteristics such as breasts. Garfinkel stated:

Medical history
Torres was found to have XY chromosomes, and neither a uterus nor the hypothesized tumor that might produce estrogen. She was referred to Dr.Robert Stoller, and was interviewed by him; Dr.Alexander Rosen, a psychologist; and Harold Garfinkel, a sociologist interested in the way sex works in society. Torres was taken to be an example of testicular feminization syndrome. She refused to meet or be classified with any other transgender people or homosexuals. She was recommended for surgery as an intersex patient, at a time when such surgery was regularly denied to transgender people. Surgery was done in 1959 by a team of doctors including Elmer Belt. Stoller presented his findings at the 1963 International Psychoanalytic Congress in Stockholm; Garfinkel included an extensive chapter on Agnes in his pioneering 1967 book on ethnomethodology. Post-operative infection and partial closure of her neovagina, weight loss that led to a reduction in breast size, and unpredictable mood changes led to problems with her boyfriend. In 1966 Torres confessed to Stoller that she had indeed taken external estrogens, causing Stoller to doubt his own theories. He retracted his earlier findings at the 1968 International Psychoanalytic Congress in Copenhagen.

References

Further reading
Schilt, Kristen (2016). "The Importance of Being Agnes". Symbolic Interaction. 39 (2): 287–294. ISSN 0195-6086.

1939 births
Living people
Place of birth missing (living people)
Transgender women
Malingering